Manini may refer to:

Acanthurus triostegus, a surgeonfish with common name Manini
Don Francisco de Paula Marín (1774–1837), a Hawaiian horticulturist often called Manini or Marini

People

Given name
Manini Mishra, an Indian TV and film actress

Surname
Fabrício Manini (1980–), a Brazilian footballer
Giuseppe Manini
Luigi Manini (1848–1936), a European architect
Roberto Manini (1942–), a retired Italian football player

Arts Entertainment and Media
Manini (1979 film), a  Odia language Indian film
Manini (2004 film), a Marathi language Indian film